Anton De Pasquale (born 14 September 1995) is an Australian motor racing driver. He currently drives the No. 11 Ford Mustang GT for Dick Johnson Racing in the Repco Supercars Championship in 2021. He briefly raced in various Formula Renault series in Europe and the Dunlop Super2 Series.

Career biography

Karting

De Pasquale competed in the Australian National Sprint Kart Championship from 2010 to 2011, winning the championship in 2011.

Formula Ford

De Pasquale raced in the Victorian Formula Ford Championship, taking second place in the championship. He then moved to the Australian Formula Ford Championship where he raced for two seasons, eventually winning the championship in 2013

Formula Renault
De Pasquale then moved to Europe to compete in the Formula Renault 1.6 NEC Championship winning seven races and gaining three podiums and winning the championship.

He then shifted to the Eurocup Formula Renault 2.0 racing for Koiranen GP for all but 5 races. He scored 4 points and ended the season in 18th place.

Supercars Dunlop Series

De Pasquale then moved back into Australia to compete in the Supercars Dunlop Series racing for Paul Morris Motorsport. He scored one podium and finished in 11th place in the standings.

Career results

Karting career summary

Circuit Career

Complete Super2 Series results
(key) (Races in bold indicate pole position) (Races in italics indicate fastest lap)

Supercars Championship results

Bathurst 1000 results

Bathurst 12 Hours results

Complete S5000 results

References

 Articles, pictures & videos on Motorsport.com
 Articles, pictures & videos on Speedcafe

External links
 
 Profile on Racing Reference

Australian racing drivers
1995 births
Living people
Formula Ford drivers
Supercars Championship drivers
Australian Endurance Championship drivers
Formula Renault Eurocup drivers
Walter Lechner Racing drivers
Koiranen GP drivers
Dick Johnson Racing drivers
24H Series drivers
People from Werribee, Victoria
Racing drivers from Melbourne
Porsche Motorsports drivers